Synderesis or synteresis, in scholastic moral philosophy, is the natural capacity or disposition (habitus) of the practical reason to apprehend intuitively the universal first principles of human action.

Reason is a single faculty, but is called differently according to the end that it assigns to its search for truth; when its goal is the mere consideration (contemplation) of truth, it is called speculative reason; when it considers truth in view of action (praxis), it is called practical reason. In both cases reason uses demonstration (syllogism) as its tool; it proceeds from the understanding of previously known truths (premises) to the statement of a proposition (conclusion) whose truth follows necessarily from the premises.

How does one know that those premises (and consequently their conclusion) are true? Because they are themselves conclusions of previous demonstrations. Although one could take back this process of demonstration of the truth of premises as far as we want, a regression ad infinitum would deprive the demonstrative chain of certitude. Consequently, it is necessary that the point of departure of human reasoning be some immediately knowable, i.e. self-evident, propositions called first principles, whose truth is not, indeed cannot be, grasped through demonstration, but only by intuition (noûs).

The habit or disposition that allows the speculative reason to apprehend intuitively the principles that preside over its discursive reasoning is called "understanding of principles" (intellectus principiorum).  The principles of "non contradiction", of "identity" and of "excluded middle", all of which are ultimately based on the notion of "being", which is the first that our reason apprehends absolutely, are all examples of those principles.

Similarly, the capacity or disposition that allows the practical reason to apprehend intuitively the principles or laws that preside over its discursive reasoning regarding human action is called synderesis. Just as "being" is the first notion apprehended absolutely, so also "good" is the first thing that is apprehended by the practical reason, since everything that acts does so for an end which possesses the quality of goodness. That is why the first principle or law of the practical reason is "good is to be done and pursued, and evil is to be avoided". Also the precepts of natural law can be considered object of synderesis insofar as all the things towards which the human being has a natural inclination are naturally apprehended by the intellect as good and therefore as objects to be pursued, and their opposites as evils to be avoided.

Synderesis is the capacity not only to apprehend the first principles, but also to judge every step of the practical discourse in the light of those principles. But, as an intellectual disposition concerned with knowledge of the first principles of action, synderesis provides only the universal premise of the practical syllogism. Every human action, however, is singular, contingent and takes place in particular circumstances. That is why the whole picture concerning human action includes powers, dispositions and acts such as conscience, desire, will, etc.

The origin of the notion of synderesis as presented here can be traced, on the one hand, to the Commentary on Ezechiel by Saint Jerome (A.D. 347–419), where syntéresin (συντήρησιν) is mentioned among the powers of the soul and is described as the spark of conscience (scintilla conscientiae), and, on the other, to the interpretation of Jerome's text given, in the 13th century, by Albert the Great and Thomas Aquinas in the light of Aristotelian psychology and ethics. The word synderesis is by most scholars reckoned to be a corruption of the Greek word for shared knowledge or conscience, syneidêsis, the corruption appearing in the medieval manuscripts of Jerome's Commentary.

An alternative interpretation of synderesis was proposed by Bonaventure, who considered it as the natural inclination of the will towards moral good.

The term is found applied in psychiatric studies too, with particular reference to psychopathy.

Notes

External links
 Medieval Theories of Conscience entry in the Stanford Encyclopedia of Philosophy

Reasoning
Scholasticism
Concepts in ethics